William "Bill" James Beck Sr. is a former Republican member of the Montana Legislature. He was elected to House District 6 which includes the Whitefish area. He served in that capacity from 2007 to 2013.

See also 
 Montana House of Representatives, District 6

References

External links 
 William Beck Sr. at ballotpedia.org

Living people
Republican Party members of the Montana House of Representatives
Montana State University alumni
1934 births